Horace Sumner Lyman (December 18, 1855 – December 22, 1904) was a prominent journalist, historian, and educator in the U.S. state of Oregon. His father, Horace Lyman, was an Oregon pioneer in 1848.

Lyman served as editor of the Portland Pacific Express starting in 1885 and the Prohibition Star beginning in 1887. He contributed a number of firsthand accounts of Oregon pioneers to the Oregon Historical Quarterly, and published a history of the state in four volumes.

References 

Educators from Portland, Oregon
Journalists from Portland, Oregon
Historians of Oregon
1855 births
1904 deaths
People from Polk County, Oregon
19th-century American educators